Gagnon may refer to:

 Gagnon (surname), people with the surname Gagnon
 Gagnon, Quebec, a ghost town in East-Central Quebec, Canada
 Gagnon v. Scarpelli, a United States Supreme Court case

See also
 Gagné